Bukovica pri Vodicah (in older sources also Bukovca) is a settlement in the Municipality of Vodice in the Upper Carniola region of Slovenia.

Name
The name of the settlement was changed from Bukovica to Bukovica pri Vodicah (literally, 'Bukovica near Vodice') in 1953.  Bukovica is a common toponym and oronym in Slovenia. It is derived from the adjective bukov 'beech' (from bukev 'beech tree') and originally referred to the local vegetation. In the past the German name was Bukowitz.

References

External links 

Bukovica pri Vodicah on Geopedia

Populated places in the Municipality of Vodice